The Harriet Irving Botanical Gardens (HIBG) are located in Wolfville, Nova Scotia, Canada, on the Acadia University campus. The HIBG is a popular tourist destination in the Annapolis Valley. The garden consists of nine native habitats of the Acadian Forest Region, a Medicinal and Food Garden, Conservatory, Formal Walled Garden, and Experimental Garden. The HIBG is also the trail head for 1.5 km of woodland trails. The Harriet Irving Botanical Garden is connected to the K.C Irving Environmental Centre (KCIC) with laboratories, greenhouses, and controlled environmental facilities. The HIBG and K.C Irving centre run educational and recreational programs for the public, hold seminars on various topics  and facilitate conferences and meetings. The staff of the HIBG act as coordinators for PlantWatch, a national program which encourages youth and members of the community to report the blooming times of selected plants to help track global warming and other ecological activities.

History 
The HIBG and KCIC were given to Acadia University by the Irving family on September 14, 2002. The Harriet Irving Botanical Gardens are named after Kenneth Colin Irving's wife, Harriet Irving. The gardens were designed by architect Alex Novell and construction began in the fall of 1999. It was the intention of the Irving family to create a space that would be conducive to the interaction of ideas from students, faculty, and the community. The emblem of the gardens features a mayflower; the official flower of Nova Scotia, as well as Harriet Irving's favorite flower, a honey bee representing hard work, and the scotch thistle symbolizing Scotland from where the Irving family originated, as well as the country Nova Scotia is named after. The gates of the HIBG opened on September 14, 2002, and the garden open to the public free of admission due to the K.C Irving Environmental Trust. The funding of the HIBG is provided by the K.C. Irving Environmental Trust as well as donors ranging from individual students to some of Canada's largest corporations.

Attractions 
The Harriet Irving Botanical Gardens consists of six acres divided into nine unique habitats of the Acadian Forest Region. The native plants are labelled with their botanical name and common name. Like all botanical gardens, the HIBG maintains a collection consisting of native plants to the Acadian Forest for conservational, educational, and scientific reasons. The HIBG have three living specimens of endangered species that are protected under the Nova Scotia Endangered Species Act. The Pink coreopsis (Coreopsis rosea), Water-pennywort (Hydrocotyle umbellata), and Thread-leaved Sundew (Drosera filiformis) are all on display at the gardens to help educate future generations on the importance of environmental conservation and facilitate further research into the conservation of these species.

As visitors travel through the gardens they pass through a walled garden, experimental garden, medicinal garden, deciduous woodland, freshwater inland marsh, bog, coastal headlands, mixed woodlands, calcareous woodlands, wet woodlands, sand barrens, coniferous woodland, and finish in the conservatory which leads to the KCIC. The arrangement of the habitats allows for explorers of the garden to experience the natural habitats of the Acadian Forest without the lengthy travel to different locations around the province. An article in the local paper, The Grapevine  gives descriptions of interesting events and updates to the gardens regularly.

Each spring the volunteers of the HIBG hold a native plant sale to encourage the integration of native plants into gardens. Seeds are collected from the plant materials in the garden, propagated and sold each year to support the volunteer group and conservations efforts.

Walled Garden 
The tall iron gates lead into this garden which is designed as a typical English garden with the exception of utilizing all native plants to the Acadian forest. The plants are pruned to conform to the symmetrical aspects of the traditional English garden style. Ten foot brick walls surround the garden on the West and South side creating a microclimate that provides an early spring. This garden complements the formal Georgian-style architecture of the K.C. Irving Environmental Science Centre with the picturesque landscape of the Acadian Forest Region. Harriet Irving's favorite flower can be seen in bloom in late April in the bordering flower beds.

Experimental Garden 
There are several sunken plant beds with eight different representative soil types which host many research projects. This garden allows for plants to be kept on a long term basis, and be exposed to the seasonal changes of the Maritime climate. Plants are stored here before being planted into the gardens, or utilized is research and conservation projects.

Medicinal Garden 
In this area a collection of plants used by indigenous peoples and early European settlers can be viewed. This is the only area of the garden which displays non-indigenous species to the Acadian Forest Region. However, many of these plants escaped early homesteads and have become naturalized in the region. A white cedar hedge surrounds the garden, and two rows of linden trees create a pleached hedge along the pathway. Interpretive signs are displayed throughout the garden explaining the early uses of the medicinal and food plants displayed.

Deciduous Woodlands 
The deciduous woodlands are characterized by broad-leaved hardwood trees and associated shade-tolerant plants. The soil is rich in organic matter and neutral in pH. Ferns are predominant in the understory and the ostrich fern can be found providing fiddle heads in the spring. Deciduous woodlands are home to a variety of insects and fauna.

Bog 
An artificial bog has been created to demonstrate a mossy, peat-covered wetland. Plants such as the Pitcher plant, can be witnessed growing in this area of the HIBG. Plants that thrive in bogs are adapted to nutrient poor, acidic soil. "Other plants include bog laurel, leatherleaf, white-fringed orchid, rose pogonia, grass-pink, bog huckleberry, dragon’s-mouth, as well as bunchberry, goldthread, starflowers, reindeer moss, beak-rush, liverwort, bulrush, lichens, chokecherry, sedges and cottongrass".

Freshwater Inland Marsh 
In this area of the garden is a man-made pond which is host to many of the native species of plants including cattails, water-lilies, and arrowheads. Freshwater Inland Marshes are important ecosystems for water fowl.

Coastal Headlands 
Across from the freshwater inland marsh, are the coastal headlands which represent one of the most unique habitats of the Acadian Forest Region, and are in danger of disappearing due to the development of coastal areas. Plants growing in this area have little to no soil, and are exposed to salt spray from the Atlantic Ocean. From the oval lawn which divides the coastal headlands and freshwater inland marsh, an herbaceous bank can be admired which is decorated with native plants that provide colorful blossoms through the spring, summer and fall seasons. These plants are a representation of plants that can be integrated into home gardens to provide native pollinators a good source of nectar and habitat. Examples of such plants include Turtlehead (Chelone glabra), Joe-Pye Weed (Eupatorium maculatum), and Brown Eyed-Susans (Rudbeckia hirta).

Mixed Woodlands 
This habitat consists of both coniferous and deciduous trees, and defines the Acadian Forest Region.

Calcareous Woodlands 
An alkaline, gypsum-based soil characterizes this habitat and are often lush in growth with many native orchids to the Acadian Forest Region.

Wet Woodlands 
A wide variety of plants and animals call areas with high water tables home. This forest is associated with the later succession stages of marshes and have been drastically reduced in the Acadian Forest Region due to development and urbanization of forested areas.

Sand Barrens 
This habitat was created by receding glaciers during the last Ice Age and includes stretches of windblown sand and silt deposits. It is dominated by low shrub species, and a few stunted tree species.

Coniferous Woodlands 
The final habitat demonstrated at the HIBG is composed of needle-bearing trees. Coniferous woodlands are dark due to the dense canopy. This habitat is home to many mushrooms and other important decomposers in the food chain.

K.C Irving Environmental Centre 
The centre provides a space for students, researchers, and faculty to conduct studies in ecology and conservation. In the basement of the centre the E.C Smith Herbarium can be found. The herbarium contributes to research and conservation of native plants by providing information relating to geographic distribution, flowering and fruiting dates, habitat preferences and other information related to botanical research. A seed and tissue bank for native plants of the Acadian Forest Region is also being developed in the centre for the preservation of biodiversity and propagation of threatened species.

References 

Botanical gardens in Canada